Los Puertos de Altagracia is the capital of the Miranda Municipality , which is located in the eastern coast of Lake Maracaibo in Zulia, Venezuela.

External links
Miranda Municipality, Zulia

Populated places in Zulia